Konongo (also Konongo-Odumase) is a gold bar mining and manganese mining community located in Ashanti, Ghana. The town serves as the capital of the Asante Akim Central Municipal. As of 2012, Konongo has a settlement population of 41,238 people.

Toponymy 
The name of Konongo is derived from rural folklore of drinking palm oil (kor-nom-ngo).

Gold Mining and Manganese Mining
The Gold mining town of Konongo has always been a lively town. It was a very boisterous town many decades before the 1950s. Konongo was the commercial capital of the Kumasi East Council which later became the Asante-Akyem District. The Gold mines that was owned by British companies attracted many nationalities from the West African Sub-Region as well as other ethnic groups from the West African Sub-Region.

Konongo Gold Mine Konongo Gold Mine is a suspended open pit mine in Ashanti and the Konongo Gold Mine mainly produces bullion gold bars. In Raw Materials Data production data for gold for 6 years, between 1984 and 1992 can be found and the Konongo Gold Mine is controlled/owned by Signature Metals Ltd, Konongo Gold Mine is just one of 26,000 entities to be found in Raw Materials Data, the mining industry's most extensive database. Konongo has manganese ores deposits estimated at over 1.7 million metric tonnes at Odumase near Konongo in Ashanti as the Ashanti manganese ores deposits have manganese content of 19.7%.

Education

Konogo-Odumase is the location of the Konongo-Odumase Senior High School, a coeducational second cycle institution. It  was officially opened on 23 February 1953 

In December 2017, over 100 students of the Konongo-Odumase Senior High School (SHS) were displaced after a huge fire engulfed the school's boys’ dormitory on Saturday night.

Notable people
Professional footballer Sulley Muntari was born and raised in the town, as was percussionist Rebop Kwaku Baah.

Some prominent lawyers from Konongo include: Maxwell Opoku-Agyemang Esq, a senior lecturer and acting Director of the Ghana of the Ghana School of Law, Kwame Anyimadu-Antwi current Member of Parliament of Asante Akyem Central Constituency, S.K Boafo Esq, a private legal practitioner and politician, *Richard Adu Darko Esq*, a private legal practitioner, politician and entrepreneur. Prominent geographer, Hanson Frimpong-Nyantakyi and trade economist, Eugene Bempong Nyantakyi of the World Bank and African Development Bank are from this town.

See also
Geology of Ghana
Birimian

References

External links

Populated places in the Ashanti Region